Patricia de las Heras Fernandez (born June 15, 1988) is a Spanish politician and a member of the Congress of Deputies since November 2019 for the Vox party. She represents the Balearic Islands constituency.

Fernandez worked in banking before completing a law degree from University of the Balearic Islands and worked in law related to property and spatial planning. She was a member of the People's Party before joining Vox. In parliament she sits on the committee for urban planning and infrastructure.

References 

1988 births
Living people
Members of the 14th Congress of Deputies (Spain)
Vox (political party) politicians
Spanish women in politics